Bill Conall is a Canadian writer who won the Stephen Leacock Memorial Medal for Humour in 2014 for his book The Promised Land; a novel of Cape Breton.

Originally from Brockville, Ontario, Conall lived in many places across Canada before moving to Victoria County, Nova Scotia in the early 2000s. His debut book, The Rock in the Water, was published in 2009 and was also a shortlisted nominee for the Stephen Leacock Medal. His other book, "Some Days Run Long" (Boularderie Island Press, 2018), was shortlisted for the 2019 Alistair MacLeod Prize for Short Fiction.

Works
The Rock in the Water (2009)
The Promised Land (2013) )
Some Days Run Long (2018)

References

External links

21st-century Canadian novelists
Canadian male novelists
Writers from Ontario
Writers from Nova Scotia
Stephen Leacock Award winners
People from Brockville
People from Victoria County, Nova Scotia
Living people
21st-century Canadian male writers
Year of birth missing (living people)